Acheux-en-Vimeu (literally Acheux in Vimeu) is a commune in the Somme department in Hauts-de-France in northern France.

Geography
The commune comprises several small hamlets, one of which is Frireulle, where the church has a modest wall belltower.

History
The earlier spelling of the name Acheux was either Aceu or Acheu. It comes from the Celtic Achad that meant "cultivated field".

Population

See also
Communes of the Somme department

References

Communes of Somme (department)